Heister is an Americanized German surname, with the Germanic Hüster as one of its variants. Notable people with the surname include:
Beate Heister (born 1951), German billionaire
Chris Heister (born 1950), Swedish politician
Danny Heister (born 1971), Dutch table tennis player
Leopold Philip de Heister (1716-1777), German general
Lorenz Heister (1683–1758), German anatomist, surgeon and botanist
Marcel Heister (born 1992), German footballer
Stephen Heister, American aerospace engineer
Zoltán Heister (born 1961), Slovakian handball coach